Wu Songgao (1898–1953) was a politician, jurist and political scientist in the Republic of China. He was an important politician during the Wang Jingwei regime. He was born in Wuxian (now, Wuzhong District and Xiangcheng District, Suzhou), Jiangsu.

Biography 
After graduating the Fudan University, Wu Songgao went to France and entered to the Division of Law, University of Paris. After graduating it, he went to United Kingdom, and became a research worker in the University of London. Later he returned to China, and successively held the positions of President of the Post Graduate Course of Law of the Fudan University, Associate Professor of the Post Graduate Course of Law of the National Central University, and Professor of the Department of Politics of the National Central Political School.

In July 1932, Wu Songgao was appointed to the Councilor of the Executive Yuan of the National Government. Next November, he was transferred to the Councilor of the Ministry of Foreign Affairs. In July 1935, he was appointed to the Chief of the International Affairs Bureau, the Ministry of Foreign Affairs, and the secretary of the Foreign Affairs Group of the Central Political Commission. On that time, he worked as the Chief Editor of the Foreign Affairs Review Magazine and the Manager of the Political Science Society of China.

Later Wu Songgao participated to the Wang Jingwei regime, and was appointed to the Central Executive Member of the Kuomintang (Wang's clique) and the secretary of the Central Political Committee. In July 1942, he was appointed to the Chief Member of the Advisory Committee for Foreign Affairs and the Vice-Minister for Judicial Administrating. Next Year, he successively held the positions of Member of the Committee for requisitioning Japanese settlement in Hankou, Member of the Committee for requisitioning French settlement and Member of the Committee for requisitioning French settlement in Tianjin.

In April 1944, Wu Songgao was appointed to the Chief-Secretary of the Government of the Shanghai Special City. Next month, he also held the Chairman of the Committee for Baojia system in Shanghai. In January 1945, he promoted to the Ministry for Judicial Administrating, and also held the Vice-Chairman of the Committee for abolition of extraterritorial right.

After the Wang Jingwei regime had collapsed, on August 17, the Leader of the Team of the Taxation Police Bureau Zhou Gao who was a subordinate of Zhou Fohai suddenly started captured important members of the Wang Jingwei regime. On that time, Wu Songgao also arrested by Zhou Gao's group. Later the Vice-Chief of the General Staff of the China Expeditionary Army Takeo Imai urged Zhou Gao to release arrested people, so Wu also was set a free.

But on September 8 same year, Wu Songgao was arrested by the Chiang Kai-shek's National Government. Later because of the charge of treason and surrender to enemy (namely Hanjian), Wu was sentenced to life imprisonment. After the People's Republic of China had established, his treatment wasn't change.

Wu Songgao died in prison in 1953.

Alma mater 

Fudan UniversityUniversity of Paris

References

Footnotes 
 
 
  History of Prison in Shanghai The Office of Shanghai’s History (上海地方志办公室) Website
 

Politicians from Suzhou
Republic of China politicians from Jiangsu
Chinese jurists
Chinese collaborators with Imperial Japan
Prisoners and detainees of the People's Republic of China
1898 births
1953 deaths